Tayt-Lemar Trusty (born 23 November 2003) is an English professional footballer who plays for Hartlepool United, on loan from Blackpool, as a midfielder.

Club career
After playing for Blackpool, turning professional in January 2022, and after spending loan spells in non-league with Radcliffe, where he made 4 NPL appearances, and Hyde United, where he scored once in 5 NPL games, Trusty moved on loan to Hartlepool United in January 2023.

International career
In November 2022 he joined the Cyprus under-21 team for training.

References

2003 births
Living people
English footballers
Blackpool F.C. players
Radcliffe F.C. players
Hyde United F.C. players
Hartlepool United F.C. players
Northern Premier League players
English Football League players
Association football midfielders
English people of Cypriot descent